Metalhead is the fourteenth studio album by heavy metal band Saxon released in 1999.

Track listing

Personnel
 Saxon 
 Biff Byford - vocals, producer
 Paul Quinn - guitar
 Doug Scarratt - guitar
 Nibbs Carter - bass
 Fritz Randow - drums

 Additional musicians
 Nigel Glockler - written and performed "Intro"
 Chris Bay - additional keyboards

 Production
 Charlie Bauerfeind - producer, engineer, mixing
 Rainer Hänsel - executive producer
 Karo Studios, Hamburg, Germany – recording and mixing location

Charts

References

1999 albums
Saxon (band) albums
SPV/Steamhammer albums
Albums produced by Charlie Bauerfeind